A beylerbeylik was a large administrative entity within the Ottoman Empire and Safavid Empire during the 15th-18th centuries. They were governed by beylerbeys ("bey of beys" i.e., commanders-in-chief).
 For Ottoman Beyerbeyliks, see Eyalet
 For Safavid Beylerbeyliks, see Beylerbeylik (Safavid Persia)

Types of administrative division